Black-and-white monarch may refer to:

 Hooded monarch, a species of bird found in New Guinea
 Solomons monarch, a species of bird endemic to the Solomon Islands

Birds by common name